Diana (minor planet designation: 78 Diana) is a large and dark main-belt asteroid. It was discovered by German astronomer Robert Luther on March 15, 1863, and named after Diana, Roman goddess of the hunt. The orbital plane is tilted at an angle of 8.688° relative to the plane of the ecliptic. Its composition is carbonaceous and primitive. 

Photometric observations of this asteroid during 1986 and 2006–08 gave a light curve with a rotation period of 7.2991 hours and a brightness variation in the range 0.02–0.104 magnitude. Based upon radar data, the near surface solid density of the asteroid is 2.7. 78 Diana occulted a star on September 4, 1980. A diameter of 116 km was measured, closely matching the value given by the IRAS satellite.

References

External links 
 
 

Background asteroids
Diana
Diana
C-type asteroids (Tholen)
Ch-type asteroids (SMASS)
18630315